Monoxenus fuliginosus is a species of beetle in the family Cerambycidae. It was described by Charles Joseph Gahan in 1898. It is known from Kenya. It feeds on Cupressus macrocarpa and Pinus radiata.

References

fuliginosus
Beetles described in 1898